The 403 RHD is a copy of the Mercedes-Benz O303 coach bus model manufactured by Fabrika automobila Priboj (FAP) in Serbia. Similar models include the 404 RHD, which has eight cylinders instead of six, and a slightly larger luggage compartment. Plans are currently in development for the 405 RHD, which will feature ten cylinders and additional luggage compartments in the passenger area.

See also 

 List of buses

External links
 403 RHD Information
 404 RHD Information

Buses
403Rhd